Deadly Women is an American true crime documentary television series produced by Beyond International Group and airing on the Investigation Discovery (ID) network.

The series focuses on murders committed by women. It is hosted by former Federal Bureau of Investigation (FBI) criminal profiler Candice DeLong and narrated by Lynnanne Zager.

Deadly Women originally aired in 2005 as a three-part miniseries under the subtitles: “Obsession”, “Greed”, and “Revenge”. It was revived as a regularly scheduled series and began airing on December 24, 2008.  Two major changes were made: Lynnanne Zager replaced original narrator Marsha Crenshaw, and the number of cases in each episode was reduced from four to three. (The episodes were also recorded and presented in a widescreen format.)

To date, 191 episodes have aired.  Dubbed versions are also produced.  A Spanish language version airs on Discovery en Español under the title Las Verdaderas Mujeres Asesinas (True Killer Women); an Italian language version airs on Real Time Italy under the title Donne mortali (a literal translation of the English title).

Format
Each episode has a unifying theme such as jealousy, financial gain, mental illness, or crimes committed by teenagers or the elderly.  The titles of the episodes reflect the theme.  The stories are told through re-enactments and interviews.

Episodes also feature contributors in relevant fields (e.g. law enforcement, the law, the media, forensic medicine and medicine).  Diane Fanning, M. William Phelps, Gregg Olsen, Wensley Clarkson, Joan Renner, and Dr. Janis Amatuzio have made multiple appearances. Occasionally, family or friends of the subject or their victims appear to add context and/or perspective.

At the end of each segment, the actress playing the subject (and her male and female conspirators, if any) break the fourth wall and look directly at the camera as their fates are revealed.  Beginning in the ninth season, photos of the actual subjects are also shown (usually mugshots taken following their arrests, or artist renditions of said subjects if they lived before the days of modern photography).

Episodes

See also

 Facing Evil with Candice DeLong
 Snapped
 Snapped: Killer Couples
 Snapped: She Made Me Do It
 Wives with Knives

References

External links

Deadly Women  featured at AOL Television
 page at IMDb (miniseries) 
 page at IMDb (regular series)

2000s American crime television series
2010s American crime television series
2005 American television series debuts
Discovery Channel original programming
Investigation Discovery original programming
True crime television series
Television series by Beyond Television Productions